The American Institute for Medical and Biological Engineering (AIMBE) is a non-profit organization founded in 1991, and headquartered in Washington. It represents 50,000 medical and biomedical engineers, and academic institutions, private industry, and professional engineering societies.

College of Fellows
Since AIMBE’s inception, over 2,000  individuals have been inducted to AIMBE’s College of Fellows. These fellows include heads of medical and engineering schools. Some Fellows work for the government, acting as consultants, or directing clinical trials. Some Fellows are members of other prominent academic institutions, such as the National Academy of Engineering, Institute of Medicine and the National Academy of Sciences. Others have received the National Medal of Science and the National Medal of Technology. Fellows elect a Chair of the College of Fellows, who presides over the election and induction of the new class and the AIMBE Annual Meeting. 

Fellows use the post-nominal FAIMBE.

Industry Council
The Industry Council consists of  corporate leaders in the biomedical engineering field.

Partnership with FDA
AIMBE is one of many organizations that has a Network of Experts Agreement with the U.S. Food and Drug Administration (FDA).

It also partners with the FDA for its Scholars Program, which places post-doctorates in biomedical engineering fields in one-year positions at the FDA's Center for Devices and Radiological Health in Silver Spring, Maryland at the agency's White Oak campus, to serve as expert advisors to agency staff.

Notable Fellows

 Frances H. Arnold, (2001)
 Giorgio Carta, (2002)
 Rashid Bashir, (2010)
 Ravi V. Bellamkonda, (2006) President 2014-2016 
 Emery N. Brown, (2006)
 Shu Chien,  Founding Fellow(1992),  President 2000,   recipient of the 2004 Pierre Galletti Award 
 Dorin Comaniciu, (2013)
 Tejal A. Desai, (2012)
 Joseph DeSimone, (2007)
 Anthony Guiseppi-Elie, (2006), Chair, 2017.
 Trey Ideker, (2014)
 Donald E. Ingber, (2011)
 Dean Kamen, (2012)
 Jeffrey Karp, (2013)
 Jay Keasling, (2000)
 Ali Khademhosseini, (2012)
 Robert S. Langer,  Founding Fellow(1992),  Chair, 1995, inaugural recipient of the Pierre Galletti Award,
 Cato T. Laurencin, (2000),  Chair, 2008,   recipient of the 2009 Pierre Galletti Award 
 Michael I. Miller, (1998)
 David J. Mooney, (2002),   Chair, 2012
 Robert M. Nerem,   Founding President, 1992,   recipient of the 2002 Pierre Galletti Award s
 Nicholas A. Peppas,  Founding Fellow (1993), Chair, 2007,   recipient of the 2008 Pierre Galletti Award
 Marjolein van der Meulen, (2008)
 Aliasger K. Salem, (2018)
 Anthony S. Weiss, (2013)
 Leslie Ying, (2019)
 Vince Calhoun, (2014)
 Lakiesha Williams, (2020) for “outstanding contributions in traumatic brain injury research and for tireless advocacy of biomedical engineering to communities underrepresented in STEM.“
 Pavlos Vlachos

References

External links
 

Health care-related professional associations based in the United States
Biomedical engineering